Tork Mahalleh (also Romanized as Tork Maḩalleh) is a village in Khotbeh Sara Rural District, Kargan Rud District, Talesh County, Gilan Province, Iran. At the 2006 census, its population was 380, in 96 families.

References 

Populated places in Talesh County